Ijebu is a town in Owo, a local government area of Ondo State, south-western Nigeria. The transmission of courtly culture flowed in both directions between Ijebu and Owo kingdoms from the seventeenth century till date.
Oral tradition claimed that the founders were the sons of Ojugbelu Arere, the first Olowo of Owo who was a descendant of Oduduwa, the pioneer ruler of Ile-Ife.
The king of the town is called Ojomo Oluda and the incumbent Ojomo Oluda is Oba (King) Kofoworola Oladoyinbo Ojomo, a retired General of the Nigerian Army.

Notable people
Agboola Ojomo Agunloye
Engr Richard Omotayo Adewale(ASAE)

References

Towns in Nigeria
Ondo State
Towns in Yorubaland